Daniela Palmer (1907–1949), better known by her stagename Kiki Palmer, was an Italian stage, film, and radio actress.

Life and career 
Daniela Palmer was born in Milan, Italy on July 11, 1907. Palmer became an actress and in 1931 began using the stagename "Kiki Palmer". Palmer was one of the most well known and highly regarded Italian stage actresses of her time, and came to be highly regarded outside of Italy as well. From 1938-1939, Palmer used the stagename "Palma Palmer", a name suggested to her by artist Gabriele D'Annunzio.

Palmer committed suicide in Rome on August 11, 1949 after the death of her friend Eva Mangili.

Personal life 
Palmer adopted Renzo Palmer who also became an actor.

Selected filmography 

 The Wedding March (1936)
 La luce del mondo (1935)

External links

References 

1907 births
1949 deaths
Actresses from Milan
20th-century Italian actresses
Italian film actresses
Italian stage actresses
1949 suicides
Suicides in Italy